Felix Raymond "Phil" Perrault (October 27, 1915 – September 11, 1986) was an American politician who served seven terms in the Massachusetts House of Representatives. A member of the Democratic Party, he was first elected in 1964, defeating incumbent representative John Brox.

References

External links
 

1915 births
1986 deaths
Politicians from Lowell, Massachusetts
Democratic Party members of the Massachusetts House of Representatives
20th-century American politicians
Lowell Technological Institute alumni